Qin Xuejing (born August 14, 1972) is a female Chinese softball player. She competed in the 2000 Summer Olympics.

In the 2000 Olympic softball competition, she finished fourth with the Chinese team. She played one match as a pitcher.

External links
profile 

1972 births
Living people
Chinese softball players
Olympic softball players of China
Softball players at the 2000 Summer Olympics
Asian Games medalists in softball
Softball players at the 1998 Asian Games
Medalists at the 1998 Asian Games
Asian Games gold medalists for China